Gandhāra was an ancient region located in the present-day north-west Pakistan and parts of south-east Afghanistan, roughly at the outskirts of northwestern Indian subcontinent. The region centered around the Peshawar valley and Swat valley, though the cultural influence of "Greater Gandhara" extended across the Indus river to the Taxila region in Potohar Plateau and westwards into the Kabul valley in Afghanistan, and northwards up to the Karakoram range.

Gandhara's existence is attested since the time of the Rigveda, as well as the Zoroastrian Avesta, which mentions it as Vaēkərəta, the sixth most beautiful place on earth created by Ahura Mazda. It was one of the 16 Mahajanapadas of Vedic era. It was the centre of Vedic and later forms of Hinduism. Gandhara was frequently mentioned in Vedic epics, including Rig Veda, Ramayana and Mahabharata. It was the home of Gandhari, the princess of Gandhara Kingdom. 

The Iron Age Gandhara kingdom emerged as a major imperial power during the reign of King Pushkarasarin in c.550 BCE. Gandhara was conquered by the Achaemenids in the 6th century BCE, Alexander the Great in 327 BCE, and later became part of the Maurya Empire before being a centre of the Indo-Greek Kingdom. The region was a major centre for Greco-Buddhism under the Indo-Greeks and Gandharan Buddhism under later dynasties, including Indo-Scythians, Indo-Parthians and Kushans. Gandhara was also a central location for the spread of Buddhism to Central Asia and East Asia.

Famed for its unique Gandharan style of art which is influenced by the classical Hellenistic styles, Gandhara attained its height from the 1st century to the 5th century CE under the Kushan Empire, who had their capital at Peshawar (Puruṣapura). Gandhara "flourished at the crossroads of India, Central Asia, and the Middle East," connecting trade routes and absorbing cultural influences from diverse civilizations; Buddhism thrived until the 8th or 9th centuries, when Islam first began to gain sway in the region. 

The region steadily declined after the violent invasion by Alchon Huns in 6th century, and the name Gandhara disappeared after Mahmud Ghaznavi's conquest in 1001 CE.

Terminology

Etymology
One proposed origin of the name is from the Sanskrit word  , meaning "perfume" and "referring to the spices and aromatic herbs which they (the inhabitants) traded and with which they anointed themselves.". The Gandhari people are a tribe mentioned in the Rigveda, the Atharvaveda, and later Vedic texts. They are recorded in the Avestan language of Zoroastrianism under the name Vaēkərəta. The name Gandhāra occurs later in the classical Sanskrit of the epics.

A Persian form of the name, Gandara, mentioned in the Behistun inscription of Emperor Darius I, was translated as Paruparaesanna (meaning "beyond the Hindu Kush") in Babylonian and Elamite in the same inscription.

Kandahar is sometimes etymologically associated with Gandhara. However, Kandahar was not part of the territory of Gandhara. It is instead etymologically related to "Alexandria".

Geography

The boundaries of Gandhara varied throughout history. Sometimes the Peshawar Valley and Taxila were collectively referred to as Gandhara; sometimes the Kabul Valley and Swat (Sanskrit: Suvāstu) were included. The kingdom was ruled from capitals at Kapisi (Bagram), Pushkalavati (Charsadda), Taxila, Puruṣapura (Peshawar) and in its final days from Udabhandapura (Hund) on the River Indus. Historically, it bordered ancient regions of Bactria and Ariana to the north and Arachosia and Sattagydia to the south.

Early History

Stone age
Evidence of the Stone Age human inhabitants of Gandhara, including stone tools and burnt bones, was discovered at Sanghao near Mardan Pakistan in area caves. The artefacts are approximately 15,000 years old. More recent excavations point to 30,000 years before the present.

Gandhara grave culture

Gandhara's first recorded civilization was the Grave Culture that emerged c. 1400 BCE and lasted until 800 BCE, and named for their distinct funerary practices. It was found along the Middle Swat River course, even though earlier research considered it to be expanded to the Valleys of Dir, Kunar, Chitral, and Peshawar.  It has been regarded as a token of the Indo-Aryan migrations, but has also been explained by local cultural continuity. Backwards projections, based on ancient DNA analyses, suggest ancestors of Swat culture people mixed with a population coming from Inner Asia Mountain Corridor, which carried Steppe ancestry, sometime between 1900 and 1500 BCE.

Gandhāra Kingdom 

The Gāndhārī king Nagnajit and his son Svarajit are mentioned in the s, according to which they received Brahmanic consecration, but their family's attitude towards ritual is mentioned negatively, with the royal family of Gandhāra during this period following non-Brahmanical religious traditions. According to the Jain , Nagnajit, or Naggaji, was a prominent king who had adopted Jainism and was comparable to Dvimukha of Pāñcāla, Nimi of Videha, Karakaṇḍu of Kaliṅga, and Bhīma of Vidarbha; Buddhist sources instead claim that he had achieved .

By the later Vedic period, the situation had changed, and the Gāndhārī capital of Takṣaśila had become an important centre of knowledge where the men of  went to learn the three Vedas and the eighteen branches of knowledge, with the  recording that s went north to study.

During the 6th century BCE, Gandhāra was an important imperial power in north-west Iron Age South Asia, with the valley of Kaśmīra being part of the kingdom, while the other states of the Punjab region, such as the Kekayas, Madrakas, Uśīnaras, and Shivis being under Gāndhārī suzerainty. The Gāndhārī king Pukkusāti, who reigned around 550 BCE, engaged in expansionist ventures which brought him into conflict with the king Pradyota of the rising power of Avanti. Pukkusāti was successful in this struggle with Pradyota, but war broke out between him and the Pāṇḍava tribe located in the Punjab region, and who were threatened by his expansionist policy. Pukkusāti also engaged in friendly relations with the king Bimbisāra of Magadha.

Due to this important position, Buddhist texts listed the Gandhāra kingdom as one of the sixteen s ("great realms") of Iron Age South Asia.

Achaemenid Gandhara

By the later 6th century BCE, the founder of the Persian Achaemenid Empire, Cyrus, soon after his conquests of Media, Lydia, and Babylonia, marched into Gandhara and annexed it into his empire. The scholar Kaikhosru Danjibuoy Sethna advanced that Cyrus had conquered only the trans-Indus borderlands around Peshawar which had belonged to Gandhāra while Pukkusāti remained a powerful king who maintained his rule over the rest of Gandhāra and the western Punjab.

However, according to the scholar Buddha Prakash, Pukkusāti might have acted as a bulwark against the expansion of the Persian Achaemenid Empire into north-west South Asia. This hypothesis posits that the army which Nearchus claimed Cyrus had lost in Gedrosia had in fact been defeated by Pukkusāti's Gāndhārī kingdom.

It is unknown whether Pukkusāti remained in power after the Achaemenid conquest as a Persian vassal or if he was replaced by a Persian satrap (governor), although Buddhist sources claim that he renounced his throne and became a monk after becoming a disciple of the Buddha. The annexation under Cyrus was limited to Gandhāra proper, after which the peoples of the Punjab region previously under Gāndhārī authority took advantage of the new power vacuum to form their own states.

Under Persian rule, a system of centralized administration, with a bureaucratic system, was introduced into the Indus Valley for the first time. Provinces or "satrapy" were established with provincial capitals.

Gandhara satrapy, established 518 BCE with its capital at Pushkalavati (Charsadda).

The inscription on Darius' (521–486 BCE) tomb at Naqsh-i-Rustam near Persepolis records Gadāra (Gandāra) along with Hindush (Hənduš, Sindh) in the list of satrapies. By about 380 BC the Persian hold on the region had weakened. Many small kingdoms sprang up in Gandhara.

Macedonian Gandhara

In 327 BCE, Alexander the Great conquered Gandhara as well as the Indian satrapies of the Persian Empire. The expeditions of Alexander were recorded by his court historians and by Arrian (around 175 CE) in his Anabasis Alexandri and by other chroniclers many centuries after the event.

In the winter of 327 BCE, Alexander invited all the chieftains in the remaining five Achaemenid satraps to submit to his authority. Ambhi, then ruler of Taxila in the former Hindush satrapy complied, but the remaining tribes and clans in the former satraps of Gandhara, Arachosia, Sattagydia and Gedrosia rejected Alexander's offer.

The first tribe they encountered were the Aspasioi tribe of the Kunar Valley, who under the leadership of their queen Cleophis initiated a fierce battle against Alexander, in which he himself was wounded in the shoulder by a dart. However, the Aspasioi eventually lost and 40,000 people were enslaved. Alexander then continued in a southwestern direction where he encountered the Assakenoi tribe of the Swat & Buner valleys in April 326 BCE. The Assakenoi fought bravely and offered stubborn resistance to Alexander and his army in the cities of Ora, Bazira (Barikot) and Massaga. So enraged was Alexander about the resistance put up by the Assakenoi that he killed the entire population of Massaga and reduced its buildings to rubble. A similar slaughter then followed at Ora, another stronghold of the Assakenoi. The stories of these slaughters reached numerous Assakenians, who began fleeing to Aornos, a hill-fort located between Shangla and Kohistan. Alexander followed close behind their heels and besieged the strategic hill-fort, eventually capturing and destroying the fort and killing everyone inside. The remaining smaller tribes either surrendered or like the Astanenoi tribe of Pushkalavati (Charsadda) were quickly neutralized where 38,000 soldiers and 230,000 oxen were captured by Alexander. Eventually Alexander's smaller force would meet with the larger force which had come through the Khyber Pass met at Attock. With the conquest of Gandhara complete, Alexander switched to strengthening his military supply line, which by now stretched dangerously vulnerable over the Hindu Kush back to Balkh in Bactria.

After conquering Gandhara and solidifying his supply line back to Bactria, Alexander combined his forces with the King Ambhi of Taxila and crossed the River Indus in July 326 BCE to begin the Archosia (Punjab) campaign. Alexander nominated officers as Satraps of the new provinces, and in Gandhara, Oxyartes was nominated to the position of Satrap in 326 BCE.

Mauryan Gandhara

After a battle with Seleucus Nicator (Alexander's successor in Asia) in 305 BCE, the Mauryan Emperor extended his domain up to and including present Southern Afghanistan. With the completion of the Empire's Grand Trunk Road, the region prospered as a centre of trade. Gandhara remained a part of the Mauryan Empire for about a century and a half.

Ashoka, the grandson of Chandragupta, was one of the greatest Indian rulers. Like his grandfather, Ashoka also started his career in Gandhara as a governor. Later he became a Buddhist and promoted Buddhism. He built many stupas in Gandhara. Mauryan control over the northwestern frontier, including the Yonas, Kambojas, and the Gandharas, is attested from the Rock Edicts left by Ashoka.

According to one school of scholars, the Gandharas and Kambojas were cognate people. It is also contended that the Kurus, Kambojas, Gandharas and Bahlikas were cognate people and all had Iranian affinities, or that the Gandhara and Kamboja were nothing but two provinces of one empire and hence influencing each other's language. However, the local language of Gandhara is represented by Panini's conservative bhāṣā ("language"), which is entirely different from the Iranian (Late Avestan) language of the Kamboja that is indicated by Patanjali's quote of Kambojan śavati 'to go' (= Late Avestan šava(i)ti).

Ancient Era

Indo-Greek Kingdom

The decline of the Mauryan Empire left Gandhara open to Greco-Bactrian invasions. Present-day southern Afghanistan was absorbed by Demetrius I of Bactria in 180 BCE. Around about 185 BCE, Demetrius moved into Indian subcontinent; he invaded and conquered Gandhara and the Punjab. Later, wars between different groups of Bactrian Greeks resulted in the independence of Gandhara from Bactria and the formation of the Indo-Greek kingdom. Menander I was its most famous king. He ruled from Taxila and later from Sagala (Sialkot). He rebuilt Taxila (Sirkap) and Pushkalavati. He became a Buddhist and is remembered in Buddhist records for his discussions with the great Buddhist philosopher, Nāgasena, in the book Milinda Panha.

Around the time of Menander's death in 140 BCE, the Central Asian Kushans overran Bactria and ended Greek rule there.

Indo-Scythian Kingdom
Around 80 BCE, the Sakas, diverted by their Parthian cousins from Iran, moved into Gandhara and other parts of Pakistan and Western India. The most famous king of the Sakas, Maues, established himself in Gandhara.

Indo-Parthian Kingdom
By 90 BCE the Parthians had taken control of eastern Iran and, around 50 BCE, they put an end to the last remnants of Greek rule in today's Afghanistan. Eventually an Indo-Parthian dynasty succeeded in taking control of Gandhara. The Parthians continued to support Greek artistic traditions. The start of the Gandharan Greco-Buddhist art is dated to about 75–50 BCE. Links between Rome and the Indo-Parthian kingdoms existed. There is archaeological evidence that building techniques were transmitted between the two realms. Christian records claim that around 40 CE Thomas the Apostle visited the Indian subcontinent and encountered the Indo-Parthian king Gondophares.

Kushan Gandhara

The Parthian dynasty fell in about 75 to another group from Central Asia. The Kushans, known as Yuezhi in the Chinese source Hou Han Shu (argued by some to be ethnically Asii) moved from Central Asia to Bactria, where they stayed for a century. Around 75 CE, one of their tribes, the Kushan (Kuṣāṇa), under the leadership of Kujula Kadphises gained control of Gandhara. The Kushan empire began as a Central Asian kingdom, and expanded into Afghanistan and northwestern India in the early centuries CE.

The Kushan period is considered the Golden Period of Gandhara. Peshawar Valley and Taxila are littered with ruins of stupas and monasteries of this period. Gandharan art flourished and produced some of the best pieces of sculpture from the Indian subcontinent. Many monuments were created to commemorate the Jatakas.

Gandhara's culture peaked during the reign of the great Kushan king Kanishka the Great (127 CE – 150 CE). The cities of Taxila (Takṣaśilā) at Sirsukh and Purushapura (modern day Peshawar) reached new heights. Purushapura along with Mathura became the capital of the great empire stretching from Central Asia to Northern India with Gandhara being in the midst of it. Emperor Kanishka was a great patron of the Buddhist faith; Buddhism spread from India to Central Asia and the Far East across Bactria and Sogdia, where his empire met the Han Empire of China. Buddhist art spread from Gandhara to other parts of Asia. Under Kanishka, Gandhara became a holy land of Buddhism and attracted Chinese pilgrims eager to view the monuments associated with many Jatakas.

In Gandhara, Mahayana Buddhism flourished and Buddha was represented in human form. Under the Kushans new Buddhists stupas were built and old ones were enlarged. Huge statues of the Buddha were erected in monasteries and carved into the hillsides. Kanishka also built a great 400-foot tower at Peshawar. This tower was reported by Chinese monks Faxian, Song Yun, and Xuanzang who visited the country. This structure was destroyed and rebuilt many times until it was finally destroyed by Mahmud of Ghazni in the 11th century.

Kidarites
The Kidarites conquered Peshawar and parts of northwest Indian subcontinent including Gandhara probably sometime between 390 and 410 from Kushan empire, around the end of the rule of Gupta Emperor Chandragupta II or beginning of the rule of Kumaragupta I. It is probably the rise of the Hephthalites and the defeats against the Sasanians which pushed the Kidarites into northern India. Their last ruler in Gandhara was Kandik, around 500 CE.

Alchon Huns
The Alchon invasion of the Indian subcontinent eradicated the Kidarite Huns who had preceded them by about a century, and contributed to the fall of the Gupta Empire, in a sense bringing an end to Classical India.

Hephthalite Empire

The Hūṇas (as they were known in India) were initially based in the Oxus basin in Central Asia and established their control over Gandhara in the northwestern part of the Indian subcontinent by about 465 CE. From there, they fanned out into various parts of northern, western, and central India. The Hūṇas are mentioned in several ancient texts such as the Rāmāyaṇa, Mahābhārata, Purāṇas, and Kalidasa's Raghuvaṃśa.

Numerous incidents of violence were reported during this period. The Dharmarajika Stupa at Takṣaśilā has evidence of a massacre there by the Huns. Mihirakula is said to have become a "terrible persecutor" of Buddhism which may have contributed to decline of Buddhism in the Gandhara region. Xuanzang tells us that initially Mihirakula was interested in learning about Buddhism, and asked the monks to send him a teacher; the monks insulted him by recommending a servant of his own household for the purpose. This incident is said to have turned Mihirakula virulently anti-Buddhist, although some have suggested the anti-Buddhist reputation was exaggerated. It is possible that Mihirakula, who may have been inclined toward Shaivism (although his coins also have representations of other deities such as the goddess Lakshmi), was inimical toward both Buddhists and Jainas.

The travel records of many Chinese Buddhist pilgrims record that Gandhara was going through a transformation during these centuries. Buddhism was declining, and Hinduism was rising. Faxian traveled around 400, when Prakrit was the language of the people, and Buddhism was flourishing. 100 years later, when Song Yun visited in 520, a different situation was described: the area had been destroyed by the White Huns and was ruled by Lae-Lih, who did not practice the laws of the Buddha. Xuanzang visited India around 644 CE and found Buddhism on the wane in Gandhara and Hinduism in the ascendant. Gandhara was ruled by a king from Kabul, who respected Buddha's law, but Taxila was in ruins, and Buddhist monasteries were deserted.

Later History

Kabul Shahi

After the fall of the Sassanid Empire to the Arabs in 651 CE, the region south of the Hindukush along with Gandhara came under pressure from Muslims. After failure of multiple campaigns by Arabs they failed to extend their rule to Gandhara.

Gandhara was ruled from Kabul by the Kabul Shahi for next 200 years. Sometime in the 9th century the Kabul Shahi were replaced by the Hindu Shahi.

Hindu Shahi and Decline

Based on various records it is estimated that Hindu Shahi was formed in 850 CE. According to Al-Biruni (973–1048), Kallar, a Brahmin minister, founded the Hindu Shahi dynasty around 843 CE. The dynasty ruled from Kabul, later moved their capital to Udabhandapura. They built great temples all over their kingdoms. Some of these buildings are still in good condition in the Salt Range of the Punjab.

Jayapala was the last great king of the Hindu Shahi dynasty. His empire extended from west of Kabul to the river Sutlej. However, this expansion of Gandhara kingdom coincided with the rise of the powerful Ghaznavid Empire under Sabuktigin. Defeated twice by Sabuktigin and then by Mahmud of Ghazni in the Kabul valley, Jayapala gave his life on a funeral pyre. Anandapala, a son of Jayapala, moved his capital near Nandana in the Salt Range. In 1021 the last king of this dynasty, Trilochanapala, was assassinated by his own troops which spelled the end of Gandhara. Subsequently, some Shahi princes moved to Kashmir and became active in local politics.

The city of Kandahar in Afghanistan is said to have been named after Gandhara. According to H.W. Bellow, an emigrant from the collapsing Gandhara region in the 5th century brought this name to modern Kandahar.

Rediscovery

By the time Gandhara had been absorbed into the empire of Mahmud of Ghazni, Buddhist buildings were already in ruins and Gandhara art had been forgotten. After Al-Biruni, the Kashmiri writer Kalhaṇa wrote his book Rajatarangini in 1151. He recorded some events that took place in Gandhara, and provided details about its last royal dynasty and capital Udabhandapura.

In the 19th century, British soldiers and administrators started taking an interest in the ancient history of the Indian Subcontinent. In the 1830s coins of the post-Ashoka period were discovered, and in the same period Chinese travelogues were translated. Charles Masson, James Prinsep, and Alexander Cunningham deciphered the Kharosthi script in 1838. Chinese records provided locations and site plans for Buddhist shrines. Along with the discovery of coins, these records provided clues necessary to piece together the history of Gandhara. In 1848 Cunningham found Gandhara sculptures north of Peshawar. He also identified the site of Taxila in the 1860s. From then on a large number of Buddhist statues were discovered in the Peshawar valley.

Archaeologist John Marshall excavated at Taxila between 1912 and 1934. He discovered separate Greek, Parthian, and Kushan cities and a large number of stupas and monasteries. These discoveries helped to piece together much more of the chronology of the history of Gandhara and its art.

After 1947 Ahmed Hassan Dani and the Archaeology Department at the University of Peshawar made a number of discoveries in the Peshawar and Swat Valley. Excavation of many of the sites of Gandhara Civilization are being done by researchers from Peshawar and several universities around the world.

Language

Gandhara's language was a Prakrit or "Middle Indo-Aryan" dialect, usually called Gāndhārī. Hindko from Peshawar which was the capital of Gandhara, came from Shuraseni prakrit a language spoken in Gandhara. Under the Kushan Empire, Gāndhārī spread into adjoining regions of South and Central Asia. It used the Kharosthi script, which is derived from the Aramaic script, and it died out about in the 4th century CE. 

Linguistic evidence links some groups of the Dardic languages with Gandhari. The Kohistani languages, now all being displaced from their original homelands, were once more widespread in the region and most likely descend from the ancient dialects of the region of Gandhara. The last to disappear was Tirahi, still spoken some years ago in a few villages in the vicinity of Jalalabad in eastern Afghanistan, by descendants of migrants expelled from Tirah by the Afridi Pashtuns in the 19th century. Georg Morgenstierne claimed that Tirahi is "probably the remnant of a dialect group extending from Tirah through the Peshawar district into Swat and Dir". Nowadays, it must be entirely extinct and the region is now dominated by Iranian languages brought in by later migrants, such as Pashto. Among the modern day Indo-Aryan languages still spoken today, Torwali shows the closest linguistic affinity possible to Niya, a dialect of Gāndhārī.

Religion

Buddhism

Mahāyāna Buddhism
Mahāyāna Pure Land sutras were brought from the Gandhāra region to China as early as 147 CE, when the Kushan monk Lokakṣema began translating some of the first Buddhist sutras into Chinese. The earliest of these translations show evidence of having been translated from the Gāndhārī language. Lokakṣema translated important Mahāyāna sūtras such as the Aṣṭasāhasrikā Prajñāpāramitā Sūtra, as well as rare, early Mahāyāna sūtras on topics such as samādhi, and meditation on the Buddha Akṣobhya. Lokaksema's translations continue to provide insight into the early period of Mahāyāna Buddhism. This corpus of texts often includes and emphasizes ascetic practices and forest dwelling, and absorption in states of meditative concentration:

Some scholars believe that the Mahāyāna Longer Sukhāvatīvyūha Sūtra was compiled in the age of the Kushan Empire in the 1st and 2nd centuries CE, by an order of Mahīśāsaka bhikṣus which flourished in the Gandhāra region. However, it is likely that the longer Sukhāvatīvyūha owes greatly to the Mahāsāṃghika-Lokottaravāda sect as well for its compilation, and in this sutra there are many elements in common with the Lokottaravādin Mahāvastu. There are also images of Amitābha Buddha with the bodhisattvas Avalokiteśvara and Mahāsthāmaprāpta which were made in Gandhāra during the Kushan era.

The Mañjuśrīmūlakalpa records that Kaniṣka of the Kushan Empire presided over the establishment of the Mahāyāna Prajñāpāramitā teachings in the northwest. Tāranātha wrote that in this region, 500 bodhisattvas attended the council at Jālandhra monastery during the time of Kaniṣka, suggesting some institutional strength for Mahāyāna in the north-west during this period. Edward Conze goes further to say that Prajñāpāramitā had great success in the north-west during the Kushan period, and may have been the "fortress and hearth" of early Mahāyāna, but not its origin, which he associates with the Mahāsāṃghika branch of Buddhism.

Destruction of Buddhist relics by Taliban
Swat Valley in Pakistan has many Buddhist carvings, and stupas, and Jehanabad contains a Seated Buddha statue. Kushan era Buddhist stupas and statues in Swat valley were demolished after two attempts by the Taliban and the Jehanabad Buddha's face was dynamited. Only the Buddhas of Bamiyan were larger than the carved giant Buddha statues in Swat near Manglore which the Taliban attacked. The government did nothing to safeguard the statue after the initial attempts to destroy the Buddha, which did not cause permanent harm. But when a second attack took place on the statue, the feet, shoulders, and face were demolished. Taliban and looters destroyed many of Pakistan's Buddhist artefacts from the Buddhist Gandhara civilization especially in the Swat Valley.

Buddhist translators

Gandharan Buddhist missionaries were active with other monks from Central Asia from the 2nd century CE in the Han-dynasty (202 BC – 220 CE) at China's capital of Luoyang and particularly distinguished themselves by their translation work. They promoted scriptures from Early Buddhist schools as well as those from the Mahāyāna. These translators included:
 Lokakṣema, a Kushan and the first to translate Mahāyāna scriptures into Chinese (167–186)
 Zhi Yao, a Kushan monk, second generation of translators after Lokakṣema
 Zhi Qian (220–252), a Kushan monk whose grandfather had settled in China during 168–190
 Zhi Yue, a Kushan monk who worked at Nanjing
 Dharmarakṣa (265–313), a Kushan whose family had lived for generations at Dunhuang
 Jñānagupta (561–592), a monk and translator from Gandhāra
 Śikṣānanda (652–710), a monk and translator from Oḍḍiyāna, Gandhāra
 Prajñā, a monk and translator from Kabul, who educated the Japanese Kūkai in Sanskrit texts

Textual finds
The Chinese Buddhist monk Xuanzang visited a Lokottaravāda monastery in the 7th century, at Bamiyan, Afghanistan. The site of this monastery has since been rediscovered by archaeologists. Birchbark and palm leaf manuscripts of texts in this monastery's collection, including Mahāyāna sūtras, have been discovered at the site, and these are now located in the Schøyen Collection. Some manuscripts are in the Gāndhārī language and Kharoṣṭhī script, while others are in Sanskrit and written in forms of the Gupta script. Manuscripts and fragments that have survived from this monastery's collection include the following source texts:
 Pratimokṣa Vibhaṅga of the Mahāsāṃghika-Lokottaravāda (MS 2382/269)
 Mahāparinirvāṇa Sūtra, a sūtra from the Āgamas (MS 2179/44)
 Caṃgī Sūtra, a sūtra from the Āgamas (MS 2376)
 Vajracchedikā Prajñāpāramitā Sūtra, a Mahāyāna sūtra (MS 2385)
 Bhaiṣajyaguru Sūtra, a Mahāyāna sūtra (MS 2385)
 Śrīmālādevī Siṃhanāda Sūtra, a Mahāyāna sūtra (MS 2378)
 Pravāraṇa Sūtra, a Mahāyāna sūtra (MS 2378)
 Sarvadharmapravṛttinirdeśa Sūtra, a Mahāyāna sūtra (MS 2378)
 Ajātaśatrukaukṛtyavinodana Sūtra, a Mahāyāna sūtra (MS 2378)
 Śāriputrābhidharma Śāstra (MS 2375/08)

A Sanskrit manuscript of the Bhaiṣajyaguruvaiḍūryaprabhārāja Sūtra was among the textual finds at Gilgit, Pakistan, attesting to the popularity of the Medicine Buddha in Gandhāra. The manuscripts in this find are dated before the 7th century, and are written in the upright Gupta script.

Art

Gandhāra is noted for the distinctive Gandhāra style of Buddhist art, which shows influence of Parthian, Scythian, Roman, Graeco-Bactrian and local Indian influences from the Gangetic Valley. This development began during the Parthian Period (50 BCE–75 CE). The Gandhāran style flourished and achieved its peak during the Kushan period, from the 1st to the 5th centuries, but it declined and was destroyed after the invasion of the White Huns in the 5th century. Siddhartha shown as a bejeweled prince (before the Sidhartha renounces palace life) is a common motif.

Stucco, as well as stone, were widely used by sculptors in Gandhara for the decoration of monastic and cult buildings. Stucco provided the artist with a medium of great plasticity, enabling a high degree of expressiveness to be given to the sculpture. Sculpting in stucco was popular wherever Buddhism spread from Gandhara – Afghanistan, Pakistan, India, Central Asia, and China.

Buddhist imagery combined with some artistic elements from the cultures of the Hellenistic world. An example is the youthful Buddha, his hair in wavy curls, similar to statutes of Apollo.

Sacred artworks and architectural decorations used limestone for stucco composed by a mixture of local crushed rocks (i.e. schist and granite) which resulted compatible with the outcrops located in the mountains northwest of Islamabad.

The artistic traditions of Gandhara art can be divided into following phases:
Indo-Greek art; 2nd century B.C to 1st century A.D
Indo-Scythian art; 1st century B.C to 1st century A.D
Kushan art; 1st century A.D to 4th century A.D

Important Gandharans

Important people from ancient region of Gandhara are as follows;
Pāṇini (4th century BCE), Sanskrit philologist, grammarian, and a revered scholar from Gandhara. Pāṇini is known for his text Aṣṭādhyāyī, a sutra-style treatise on Sanskrit grammar.
Chanakya (4th century BCE), an ancient Gandharan teacher, philosopher, economist, jurist and royal advisor. He assisted the first Mauryan emperor Chandragupta in his rise to power, and his work Arthashastra is considered Pioneer of field of political science in India.
Garab Dorje (1st century CE), founder of Dzogchen (Great Perfection) tradition.
Kumāralāta (3rd century), founder of Sautrāntika school of Buddhism.
Vasubandhu (4th century), considered one of the most influential thinkers in the Gandharan Buddhist philosophical tradition. In Jōdo Shinshū, he is considered the Second Patriarch; in Chan Buddhism, he is the 21st Patriarch. His writing Abhidharmakośakārikā ("Commentary on the Treasury of the Abhidharma") is widely used in Tibetan and East Asian Buddhism.
Asanga (4th century) was "one of the most important spiritual figures" of Mahayana Buddhism and the "founder of the Yogachara school". His book Mahāyānasaṃgraha (MSg) is the key work of the Yogācāra school of Mahāyāna Buddhist philosophy.
Padmasambhāva (8th century) is considered the Second Buddha by the Nyingma school, the oldest Buddhist school in Tibet known as "the ancient one".

Major cities
Major cities of ancient Gandhara are as follows:
Puṣkalavati (Charsadda), Pakistan
Takshashila (Taxila), Pakistan
Puruṣapura (Peshawer), Pakistan 
Sagala (Sialkot), Pakistan
Oddiyana (Swat), Pakistan
Chiniotis (Chiniot), Pakistan
Kapisi (Bagram), Afghanistan

Timeline

 c. 3300 – c. 1300 BCE Indus Valley civilization
 c. 1400 – c. 800 BCE Gandhara grave culture
 c. 1200 – c. 800 BCE Gandhari people mentioned in Rigveda and Atharvaveda.
 c. 800 – c. 518 BCE Gandhara Kingdom
 c. 550 – c. 330 BCE Persian Empire. Under direct Persian control and/or local control under Achaemenid suzerainty.
 c. 326 – c. 305 BCE Occupied by Alexander the Great and Macedonian generals
 c. 305 – c. 185 BCE Controlled by the Maurya dynasty, founded by Chandragupta. Converted to Buddhism under King Ashoka (273–232 BC)
 c. 185 – c. 97 BCE Under control of the Indo-Greek Kingdom, with some incursions of the Indo-Scythians from around 100 BC
 c. 97 BCE – c. 7 CE Saka (Indo-Scythian) Rule
 c. 7 – c. 75 CE Parthian invasion and Indo-Parthian Kingdom, Rule of Commander Aspavarman?.
 c. 75 – c. 230 CE Kushan Empire
 c. 230 – c. 440 CE Kushanshas under Persian Sassanid suzerainty
 c. 450 – c. 565 CE White Huns (Hephthalites)
 c. 565 – c. 644 CE Nezak kingdom, ruled from Kapisa and Udabhandapura
 c. 644 – c. 870 CE Kabul Shahi, ruled from Kabul
 c. 870 – 1021 CE Hindu Shahi, ruled from Udabhandapura
 c. 1021 – c. 1100 CE Conquered and controlled by the Ghaznavid empire

See also

Gandhari people
History of India
History of Pakistan
Kambojas
Kashmir Smast
Mahajanapadas
Mankiala

Notes

References

Sources

 Beal, Samuel. 1884. Si-Yu-Ki: Buddhist Records of the Western World, by Hiuen Tsiang. 2 vols. Trans. by Samuel Beal. London. Reprint: Delhi. Oriental Books Reprint Corporation. 1969.
 Beal, Samuel. 1911. The Life of Hiuen-Tsiang by the Shaman Hwui Li, with an Introduction containing an account of the Works of I-Tsing. Trans. by Samuel Beal. London. 1911. Reprint: Munshiram Manoharlal, New Delhi. 1973.
 Bellew, H.W. Kashmir and Kashgar. London, 1875. Reprint: Sang-e-Meel Publications 1999 
 Caroe, Sir Olaf,  The Pathans, Oxford University Press, Karachi, 1958.
 
 
 Hill, John E. 2003. "Annotated Translation of the Chapter on the Western Regions according to the Hou Hanshu". 2nd Edition: Through the Jade Gate to Rome: A Study of the Silk Routes, 1st to 2nd Centuries CE. 2015. John E. Hill. Volume I, ; Volume II, . CreateSpace, North Charleston, S.C. 
 Hussain, J.  An Illustrated History of Pakistan, Oxford University Press, Karachi, 1983.
 Legge, James. Trans. and ed. 1886. A Record of Buddhistic Kingdoms: being an account by the Chinese monk Fâ-hsien of his travels in India and Ceylon (A.D. 399–414) in search of the Buddhist Books of Discipline. Reprint: Dover Publications, New York. 1965.
 

 Shaw, Isobel. Pakistan Handbook, The Guidebook Co., Hong Kong, 1989
 Watters, Thomas. 1904–5. On Yuan Chwang's Travels in India (A.D. 629–645). Reprint: Mushiram Manoharlal Publishers, New Delhi. 1973.

Further reading
 
 
 
 Rienjang, Wannaporn, and Peter Stewart (eds), The Rediscovery and Reception of Gandharan Art (Archaeopress, 2022) ISBN 978-1-80327-233-7.

External links

Gandharan Connections Project (Cambridge, 2016-2021)
Livius.org: Gandara 
The Buddhist Manuscript project
University of Washington's Gandharan manuscript
Coins of Gandhara janapada
Gandhara Civilization- National Fund for Cultural Heritage (Pakistan)

 
Achaemenid satrapies
Ancient empires and kingdoms of India
Ancient history of Pakistan
Archaeological sites in Pakistan
Buddhist sites in Pakistan
Ancient Asia
History of Pakistan
Historical regions of Pakistan
Kingdoms in the Ramayana
Locations in Hindu mythology
Prehistoric Pakistan